Jamie's School Dinners is a four-episode documentary series that was broadcast on Channel 4 in the United Kingdom from 23 February to 16 March 2005. The series was recorded from Spring to Winter of 2004 and featured British celebrity chef Jamie Oliver attempting to improve the quality and nutritional value of school dinners at Kidbrooke School in the Royal Borough of Greenwich. Oliver's experience on the series led to a broader national campaign called Feed Me Better, aimed at improving school dinners throughout Britain.

Kidbrooke School
At Kidbrooke, Oliver first encountered the school's seemingly fearsome head dinner lady, Nora Sands. Although the two clashed frequently over matters from kitchen technique to workload, Nora eventually became Jamie's most ardent supporter throughout the series and the campaign.
Oliver had his work cut out for him: firstly, the daily budget for school dinners was a mere 37 pence per child. Secondly, the students at the school were so used to eating processed junk food (such as deep fried meat products and chips) that Oliver faced a student rebellion when he banned junk food from the school. Thirdly, Oliver's unconventional ingredients and meal ideas startled the dinner ladies, increased their workload dramatically, and exceeded the allocated budget.

Boot camp
After a disastrous start at Kidbrooke, with students refusing to eat and dinner ladies threatening to resign due to overwork, Oliver organised a "boot camp" for dinner ladies in the borough, roping in the catering division of the British Army to demonstrate how to cook large amounts of food quickly and efficiently.

County Durham
Statistically, the English county of Durham had the highest rate of health problems among school children in the country. Oliver visited a primary school in Peterlee, and realised that part of the problem with getting children to eat healthier food was the food they were eating at home. He visited a young boy's family and convinced them to try a healthier home-cooked menu for a week.

Return to London
Returning to Greenwich, Oliver faced a student boycott of his new menu. He produced an education kit, and recruited children to work in the kitchen, demonstrating to them exactly what went into chicken nuggets, and teaching them to identify vegetables.

As the campaign gathered momentum, gaining increasing public support, Oliver approached members of the government, to campaign for increased funding for ingredients and staff wages in school canteens.

Results of the show and campaign
The British Government, and Prime Minister Tony Blair promised to take steps to improve school dinners shortly after the programme aired. 271,677 people signed an online petition on the Feed Me Better website, which was delivered to 10 Downing Street on 30 March 2005. Certain junk foods (such as the notorious Bernard Matthews "Turkey Twizzlers" much derided on the show) were banned from schools by their local borough or county council. Currently fried foods are only allowed to be served twice a week and soft drinks are no longer available. The Department for Education and Skills created the School Food Trust, a £60 Million initiative to provide support and advice to school administrators to improve the standard of school meals.

Jamie's Return to School Dinners

Starting in February 2006, Oliver returned to his crusade to see how his flagship Greenwich school, Kidbrooke, was progressing. Overworked and under pressure, Nora reveals that she is losing money due to the decision to close the school tuck shop (which sold junk food and snacks), that she wasn't being paid for the extra hours, and that she hadn't seen any of the promised money. The end-of-year deficit is between £12000 and £15000 (the school management declined to be precise, on the advice of the local council), the children are slipping back into their old habits, and Jamie's new menu is losing popularity.

In response, Jamie organises a 'Junk Amnesty' wherein the children exchange their snacks and unhealthy food for tokens which can then be redeemed for healthier meals at a kiosk Jamie sets up in their playground.

Jamie then travels to Lincolnshire and Dorset, where most of the schools have decommissioned their kitchens to save money. He pioneers a project that connects the schools to local pubs, restaurants, and hotels, and to local farmers. Produce would be sourced locally, cooked, and then taken to nearby schools by taxi or volunteer drivers. In order to make the project viable, he has to convince 90% of the local parents to participate.

A pilot scheme is started to provide Theddlethorpe and Saltfleetby primary schools in Lincolnshire as well as Broadwindsor and Mosterton primary schools in Dorset, with the help of a local pub. However, there are problems. Nora has hygiene concerns regarding the pub kitchen, and the pub cook has been altering the recipes in an attempt to save money, which Jamie remedies by introducing him to a local supplier.

Initial take-up is good, following a demonstration to parents of a terms'-worth of junk food that their children eat (a plastic mat with a pile of chips (2 binfuls), saturated fat, Coke, burgers, with a garnish of crisps and sweets), and a brief speech at the school's Easter service.

To spread the word, Jamie organises a fête for local schools, suppliers and caterers in Lincoln Castle. There he encourages connections between parents, schools, and food industry representatives. The event ('Hot Dinners For Imps') is a resounding and overwhelming success, and garners support from the local council.

Results

In London, meeting first with Alan Johnson, the Secretary of State for Education and Skills, and Prime Minister Tony Blair, Jamie secures promises of an additional £280M for 3 years, a trust to allow schools without kitchens to build, a pledge to consider a series of training kitchens across the country, and creation of a voluntary code of conduct concerning advertising of junk food to children.

Effect on exam results

In 2009, a report was released that after the implementation of Jamie's School Dinners program test scores in English and science improved. The report was conducted by the Institute for Social and Economic Research located at Essex University. It measured the performance of 11-year-old students from Greenwich, south London from 2006-2007, allowing a full year of performance to be measured.  The results showed the number of students to receive a 4 or a 5 on their science exams increased by 8%, while English scores rose by 6% and maths also showed a slight increase in performance.

Criticism
David Laws said the government rushed into the legislation too quickly, and would be unable to meet its target requirement of participation.

See also
 Healthy Kids School Canteen Association

References

External links
Feed Me Better campaign
St.Aidans Catering 4 Schools

2005 British television series debuts
2005 British television series endings
2000s British documentary television series
Channel 4 documentary series
English-language television shows
Food reality television series
Government-provided school meals in the United Kingdom
Obesity in the United Kingdom